Everbright  may refer to these sister companies:
 China Everbright Group, a state-owned enterprise owned by Central Huijin, based in Beijing
 China Everbright Holdings, wholly owned subsidiary of China Everbright Group, based in Hong Kong
 China Everbright Limited, a listed company which China Everbright Holdings was the largest shareholder
 Everbright International, a listed company which China Everbright Holdings was the largest shareholder
 Everbright Water, a listed company and subsidiary of Everbright International
 Everbright Securities, Chinese brokerage firm, a listed company which China Everbright Group was the largest shareholder
 China Everbright Bank, Chinese bank, a company jointly controlled by Everbright Group and its parent company Central Huijin

See also
 Yongchang Real Estate, a Chinese privately held real estate company, also known as Ever Bright Group
 Shijiazhuang Ever Bright F.C., a Chinese football club